The Government Law College, Coimbatore is a public law college in the state of Tamil Nadu, India. Like the rest of the law colleges in Tamil Nadu, it is administered by Tamil Nadu's Department of Legal Studies, and affiliated to Tamil Nadu Dr. Ambedkar Law University.

Location
The college is situated in the foothills of Marudamalai, 10 km away from the city.

History
The college was opened in 1979–80, the same year as the Tiruchirappalli college, joining existing government law colleges at Chennai and Madurai. The Government Law College, Coimbatore located at Avinashi Road, Coimbatore, commenced to function from August 1979. Later in January 1980, it was shifted to Race Course Road and it functioned there till January 1991. Presently, the College is housed in its own campus at Marudamalai, adjacent to the Bharathiar University. The new buildings of the Government Law College were built at a cost exceeding rupees one crore.

Facilities
The college has undergraduate and graduate programs, and maintains two hostels for male and female students.

Notable alumni
 Jeeva (artist), Lawyer, Film critic

References

External links
Official Website

Law schools in Tamil Nadu
Universities and colleges in Coimbatore
Educational institutions established in 1979
1979 establishments in Tamil Nadu
Academic institutions formerly affiliated with the University of Madras